The Last Shadow Puppets are an English supergroup consisting of Alex Turner (Arctic Monkeys), Miles Kane (The Rascals, solo artist), James Ford (Simian, Simian Mobile Disco, music producer), and Zach Dawes (Mini Mansions). The band released their debut album The Age of the Understatement in 2008. Following a lengthy hiatus, they returned, releasing second album Everything You've Come to Expect in 2016.

History

Formation
In August 2007 NME magazine reported that Arctic Monkeys lead singer Alex Turner and lead singer of then newly formed the Rascals, Miles Kane would be recording an album with Simian Mobile Disco member and former Simian drummer James Ford producing and playing drums. Turner and Kane had become friends when Kane's previous band the Little Flames played support for Arctic Monkeys on their 2005 UK tour. The Little Flames also supported Arctic Monkeys on their April 2007 UK tour, when Turner and Kane wrote songs together for a collaborative project. Their collaboration extended into Arctic Monkeys material, with Kane playing guitar on  "505", the closing track of second Arctic Monkeys album Favourite Worst Nightmare and on "Fluorescent Adolescent" B-sides "The Bakery" and "Plastic Tramp."  Kane also guested on "505" and "Plastic Tramp" at several Arctic Monkeys gigs in 2007, including the summer mini-festivals at Lancashire County Cricket Club and Arctic Monkeys' 2007 & 2013 appearances at Glastonbury.

The initial recording of the songs that would eventually form their debut album took place in France in late August 2007 with additional material added between August and December of that year. In December Owen Pallett was appointed to arrange the strings, brass and percussion for the album with the 22-piece London Metropolitan Orchestra. During the recording of the album Turner and Kane hired a documentary film-making team, Luke Seomore and Joseph Bull, to capture the story of the project.

The Age of the Understatement (2007−2008)
On 20 February 2008, Miles Kane and Alex Turner revealed they would be known as the Last Shadow Puppets and that their album would be titled The Age of the Understatement and would be released on 21 April 2008. At first, the band chose the name Shadow Puppets because they thought it sounded like a 60's girl groups band name, which they were listening to a lot at the time, someone had alredy registered the name so they ended up adding The Last to it. The band played their first ever show in Brooklyn, New York, at Sound Fix Records on 4 March 2008, playing a second gig at the Lower East Side's Cake Shop the following night. Their first show in the United Kingdom was a short two song set on 5 April at the Lock Tavern in Camden, London. They played "Meeting Place" and "Standing Next to Me" in support of Remi Nicole, who organised the party both to celebrate her birthday and to raise money for MS sufferers. 

The album went straight to number one in the UK Albums Chart. The first single, "The Age of the Understatement", was released the week before on 14 April, with new song "Two Hearts in Two Weeks" and covers of Billy Fury's "Wondrous Place" and David Bowie's "In the Heat of the Morning" —a song previously mentioned by Turner as a favourite— as b-sides.

After the album release the band played a secret set at Glastonbury on 28 June 2008 with Arctic Monkeys drummer Matt Helders playing drums on "The Age of the Understatement" and Jack White playing a guitar solo on "Wondrous Place." Two days later, they announced their debut world tour, which would start on 19 August of that year. On 4 July 2008, they performed "Standing Next to Me" as part of a birthday present for Jo Whiley on BBC Radio 1. They also performed a cover of Rihanna's "SOS".

Their second single, "Standing Next to Me", was released on 7 July 2008. That same month, the album was nominated for the 2008 Mercury Music Prize but lost out to Elbow's The Seldom Seen Kid.

On August, the band and a 16-piece orchestra, played their first tour shows at Portsmouth Guildhall and New Theatre Oxford, before attending Reading and Leeds Festivals 2008. Kane said the two festival stops would be "our [the band] first proper gigs". Their Leeds set was described by The Guardian as "a classy offering from the Puppets. But, maybe, that isn't what's needed at a festival on a Friday night". The first leg of the tour ended with a show at The Olympia in Paris on 26 August.

The tour restarted in October at Cirkus in Stockholm, and continued in continental Europe, throughout the rest of the month. On October 20, the album's third single, "My Mistakes Were Made for You", was released. Four days later they played a show at Philharmonic Hall, Liverpool as part of the Electric Proms. Their London and Sheffield shows were generally well received by both fans and critics. Turner and Kane played their last show, before going back to their respective careers, at the Mayan Theater of Los Angeles on 3 November 2008.

2009–2015: First hiatus

Now on a hiatus, and working with their bands, Turner and Kane reunited briefly at the Shockwaves NME Awards on 25 February 2009, where they won Best Music Video for My Mistakes Were Made For You directed by Richard Ayoade.

In a March 2010 interview with Absolute Radio, Alex Turner said that there were no plans for new material, however, Kane said in October 2010 they would get back together after he was done with his solo project.
That summer, the band played an acoustic set at Club Nokia in Los Angeles, for Brian O'Connor's benefit concert. This marked the first live performance of the band since 2008. A year later, Turner confirmed his interests in recording a second album. In January 2012, Kane added that he would reunite with Turner to record again as the Last Shadow Puppets "when the time is right."

On 3 February 2012, Miles Kane supported Arctic Monkeys at their Paris Olympia show. At the conclusion of the support slot, Turner joined Kane and his band to perform "Standing Next to Me". This was repeated again a year later, at Kane's Glastonbury set, near the end of his performance. On October that same year, Kane now joining the Arctic Monkeys on their headline set in Mexico, performed their last song "505" together. At Finsbury Park 2014, both reunited once more for an acoustic performance of "Standing Next to Me".

Everything You've Come to Expect (2015–2016)
In 2015 both Turner and Kane were involved in the writing of Kane's third solo album. During those sessions, a song, that would later be known as Aviation was the seed for the new Puppets record, as it sparked their desire to get the band together. During the summer of 2015 Turner, Kane, Ford and new member Zach Dawes started recording their second album at Shangri La Studios in Malibu, California.

On 19 October 2015 Owen Pallett, who contributed the string arrangements on The Age of the Understatement, confirmed work on the second album on Twitter. In an interview with the Chilean site Rock & Pop on 17 November 2015, producer James Ford confirmed that work on the second album had been completed and that the record would be released sometime in spring 2016. When asked of his recent work, Ford said, "This year, I've just done a Last Shadow Puppets record, which is the guy from Arctic Monkeys and Miles. So we did the follow-up album to that. That's the last thing I did."

On 3 December 2015, the band's official Facebook and YouTube pages released a teaser trailer for the album, also confirming for the album to be released sometime in spring 2016. People such as Turner's ex-girlfriend, Taylor Bagley, and Zach Dawes of Mini Mansions made small cameos in the video. A second teaser trailer for the album was released on 28 December 2015. The video featured Kane impersonating wrestler Ric Flair along with videos from the studio and various cinematic shots.

On 10 January 2016, the band released their first single since 2008. The song, "Bad Habits", was accompanied with a music video filmed in the same style as the first two teaser trailers. On 21 January 2016, the band announced that their second album would be entitled Everything You've Come to Expect, and would feature the return of all three previous band members, as well as the addition of bass player Zach Dawes. It was set to be released on 1 April 2016. A few days later, they announced their 2016 tour dates in support of the album. Set to start in March with a show at Usher Hall in Edinburgh. Two shows were later added during March in Cambridge and Middlesbrough.

On 10 March 2016, the band released the title track from Everything You've Come to Expect, as the album's second single. An accompanying music video was also released, of which there is 9 varieties, depicting Turner and Kane buried up to their necks on a beach while a woman dances around them. A week later 
the track "Aviation",  was released as the 3rd single. A video similar in style to Everything You've Come to Expect was released, showing Turner and Kane, digging a sand pit on the same beach they were buried on in the previous video. On 29 March 2016, the band released a 4th song, "Miracle Aligner", alongside a video that closed the trilogy started by the second single, before the release of the entire album.

While on tour, the band promoted the album with appearances on television programmes such as Le Grand Journal, Late Night with Seth Meyers, The Late Late Show with James Corden, and Later...with Jools Holland. And headlining sets in festivals such as Coachella, Radio 1's Big Weekend, Primavera Sound, Rockwave, T in the Park, and Lollapalooza in Chicago. In June 2016, the band performed on the pyramid stage at Glastonbury. During the set, they performed a cover of "Moonage Daydream" in memory of David Bowie. On July, the band played two nights at Alexandra Palace in London, on the second date, they were joined by Johnny Marr for a cover of The Smiths' "Last Night I Dreamt That Somebody Loved Me."  They ended their 2016 tour on 26 August by playing at the Rock en Seine festival in Paris, France.

On December 2, the band released The Dream Synopsis, an EP containing re-recordings of two songs, "Aviation" and "The Dream Synopsis," as well as four cover versions of The Fall's "Totally Wired," Jacques Dutronc's "Les Cactus," Glaxo Babies's "This Is Your Life," and Leonard Cohen's "Is This What You Wanted." Each cover had an accompanying music video except for "Totally Wired".

2017–present: Second hiatus
Two years after their last official release, Turner joined Miles Kane during a show at La Cigale in Paris, for a performance of the band's staple song, "Standing Next To Me." In September 2021, During an interview with Clash Magazine, Kane said a new a project could "probably be in about four years," adding, "I think there’s a bit of a myth about it and I quite like that," in regards to the eight year wait between The Age of the Understatement and Everything You've Come to Expect.

Artistry

Influences
Turner and Kane have cited Scott Walker and David Bowie as main influences, with Turner saying, “[Bowie] is sort of in the DNA of every record, to some extent. He’s been built-in for a long time”. Other artists that served as inspiration for the band include, Ennio Morricone, Serge Gainsbourg, David Axelrod, Lee Hazlewood, Jaques Brel, Isaac Hayes and bands such as, The Style Council, The Electric Prunes, Sparks, Depeche Mode and The Fall.

Stage personas and relationship
The band outfits are usually designed by Kane and Ray Brown. Turner commented on their change in appearance from their first album to the second saying "We’ve gone from The Beatles to The Fast And The Furious". When asked about the way the band presents itself on stage Kane said: "...We’re just sort of having fun in those characters but we’re very much serious, its not like we’re taking the piss, its just like why not be a bit flamboyant if you’ve got it in you, you know? The bands are so boring now days, you know, if someone wants to be a bit extravagant then I don’t see why not. The bands I love were more extravagant and extreme than we are. If everyone wants to stay square then they can stay square." Turner felt similarly, "I’ve had the phase where I enjoyed being part of a ‘well-oiled machine’ and I’m currently subscribing to the notion that the most unpredictable or unlikely moments are probably the most entertaining", and that, "in the show the space between taking it seriously and not taking it seriously is best occupied". He also, felt the band allowed him to perform differently than with the Arctic Monkeys, as Kane singing with him gave him "somewhere to hide". 

Kane and Turner's friendship is often an object of discussion, and has been described by the media as a "bromance", due to its closeness. They have referred to each other as "best mates", having bonded over their similar music taste, sense of humor, and upbringing: "we discovered that our mums have got the same kettle and toaster. Seriously. And they have the same aura. They're very similar women. We're both only children, too." In an interview with The Times, Turner claimed their first record was the consequence of friendship, not ambition, adding, "Me and Miles, if we had grown up in the same area and gone to the same school, maybe we'd be in a band together anyway," adding in another interview, "With such a close friendship we have. Wanting to work together, it brings something else. I haven’t done too much with other people… he’s kind of the only one." Hamish McBain of ShortList shared the sentiment, saying, "It's a friendship and a band born out of a desire to hang around together, egging each other on  into more flamboyant outfits, [...] most of all better music".

Awards and nominations

Band members
Alex Turner – vocals, guitar, bass guitar, percussion, keyboards (2007–present)
Miles Kane – vocals, guitar, bass guitar, saxophone (2007–present)
James Ford – drums, percussion, keyboards (2007–present)
Zach Dawes – bass guitar, percussion, guitar, keyboards (2015–present)

Live members
Alex MacNaghten − bass guitar (2008)
Stephen Fretwell – bass guitar (2008)
John Ashton – keyboards, guitar, percussion, backing vocals (2008)
Loren Humphrey − drums, percussion (2016)
Tyler Parkford − keyboards, backing vocals (2016)
Additional live members
Caroline Buckman – violin (2016)
Claudia Chopek – violin (2016)
Jennifer Takamatsu – violin (2016)
Mikala Schmitz – cello (2016)
Timeline

Discography

Studio albums

Extended plays

Singles

Promotional singles

Other charting songs

Notes

References

External links
Daily Music Guide Standing Next To You review
Review of the LSP's latest single 'My Mistakes Were Made For You'
Official website
Interview with Alex Turner, L.A. Weekly October 2008 

Musical groups established in 2007
Musical groups from Sheffield
British supergroups
Rock music supergroups
Domino Recording Company artists
NME Awards winners